Kolesin  is a village in the administrative district of Gmina Babimost, within Zielona Góra County, Lubusz Voivodeship, in western Poland.

The village has a population of 233.

References

Kolesin